Rags is a 1915 silent film produced by Famous Players Film Company and distributed by Paramount Pictures. The film was directed by James Kirkwood and starring Mary Pickford. It survives in various prints between the Library of Congress, the George Eastman House and Cinematheque Francaise. It's available to watch on YouTube from 2022

Though a Zukor produced film, the production was shot at Biograph Studios.

Cast
Mary Pickford - Alice McCloud/ "Rags"
Marshall Neilan - Keith Duncan
Joseph Manning - John Hardesty
J. Farrell MacDonald - Paul Ferguson

See also
Mary Pickford filmography

References

External links
Rags at IMDb.com
allmovie/synopsis; Rags
Full movie on YouTube

1915 films
American silent feature films
Films based on American novels
Paramount Pictures films
1915 drama films
Silent American drama films
American black-and-white films
Films directed by James Kirkwood Sr.
1910s American films
1910s English-language films